Roberta is a 1933 Broadway musical.

Roberta may also refer to:
Roberta (given name)

Entertainment
Roberta (1935 film), an adaptation of the Broadway play starring Fred Astaire, Ginger Rogers, Randolph Scott and Irene Dunne
Roberta, a 1951 Filipino film starring Tessie Agana
Roberta, a 1979 Filipino film starring Julie Vega
Roberta (2014 film), a Canadian short drama film directed by Caroline Monnet
Roberta (album), by Roberta Flack
"Roberta," a song performed by Lead Belly
"Roberta", song by Peppino di Capri 
Roberta, a character from the Donald Duck universe
 Roberta, the official name for the T-rex in Jurassic Park, more commonly known as Rexy

Places
Roberta, Georgia, United States
Roberta, Oklahoma, United States
335 Roberta, a large asteroid

Other uses
Roberta's, a Brooklyn, New York, pizzeria